Počítky is a municipality and village in Žďár nad Sázavou District in the Vysočina Region of the Czech Republic. It has about 200 inhabitants.

History
The first written mention of Počítky is from 1407.

References

Villages in Žďár nad Sázavou District